Hartford City FC is an American soccer team based in West Hartford, Connecticut. The team plays in the National Premier Soccer League Northeast Region, North Atlantic Conference. The team played its first game during the 2017 season. The Colts play their games at Trinity Health Stadium in Hartford, Connecticut.

History

The team was originally set to play indoor soccer in the Major Arena Soccer League for the 2015–16 season and also planned to form an outdoor team to join the North American Soccer League.

Hartford City FC's ownership group was unable to sign a lease for the XL Center because the city had issues with the group's handling of an outdoor soccer stadium development deal, the legal status of its main financial backer, and other critical issues. The group hoped to reconstruct Dillon Stadium in the South End of Hartford to create a 15,000 seat soccer-only stadium for the 2017 season but the city ended the project in early October 2015 over financial and legal concerns with the group. In July 2017, a U.S. District Court judge found developers James Duckett Jr. and Mitchell Anderson guilty of wire fraud, conspiracy and money laundering.

On October 28, 2015, the MASL announced that Hartford City FC would not be permitted to enter the league that season and began league-wide schedule changes to replace the failed franchise.

In 2016, local restaurateur Aaron Sarwar bought the copyright, trademark and logo for the team and began to build the team from the ground up. In November, the National Premier Soccer League announced that Hartford City FC would join the Atlantic division's White Conference for the 2017 season.

The team played their inaugural game on May 6, 2017 defeating Kingston Stockade FC 3–1 away. Their inaugural game at CCSU Soccer Field took place on May 13, 2017 where HCFC defeated Seacoast United Mariners 2–0. In their first season, the Colts finished 3rd in the White Conference with a 5–3–4 record, which qualified them for the playoffs. In the White Conference Semifinals, the Colts defeated New England rivals Boston City FC 2–1 to reach the White Conference Finals, thanks to an 85th-minute golazo from substitute Paulinton Johnson.  They would go on to lose to Kingston Stockade FC 2–1.

The 2018 season saw another third-place finish for HCFC, but they fell short after a 3–0 loss to Brooklyn Italians in the conference semifinal.

2019 was a year of new beginnings yet relative disappointment for the Colts. Head coach Christian Benjamin resigned in the offseason, technical director Nick Balistierri took over, and the club relocated to Al-Marzook Field at the University of Hartford. However, City struggled to string together momentum throughout the season, finishing .500 and out of the playoff picture for the first time in club history.  Goalkeeper and club captain Hami Kara announced his retirement at the end of the season.

In 2021, further changes at the club provided an apparent boost on and off the field.  Playing at a more intimate TD Bank Oakwood Soccer Park in nearby Portland; City found much success with a heavily rebuilt roster; highlighted by new captain Mark Grant; returnee Louis Beddouri; depth players-turned-stars Cooper Knecht, Noah Silverman, and goalkeeper Evan Dadonna; and newcomers Ben Awashie and Jamis Fite.  The Colts finished the regular season with a seven-game unbeaten streak and their first 1st-place finish in club history. City would go on to extend their unbeaten streak in the playoffs.  A scheduling conflict at Oakwood led to the Colts' first games at Dillon Stadium, years after their failed attempt to secure it as their permanent home field.  HCFC defeated Valeo FC 1–0 in the conference semifinal, launching them to their first conference final in four years.  Three days later, the Colts came out on the positive end of a hard-fought, back-and-forth affair against rival Kingston Stockade, avenging their Wooden Shoe loss and capturing their first trophy in club history.

Supporters
The Agents of Hale are an independent supporters group, and actually predate the existence of Hartford City.  AoH stand in the southern end of the CCSU Soccer Field stands with members traveling in an RV fondly called The Bucket.

AoH and supporters of Elm City Express sponsor a trophy awarded to the winner of the season series between Hartford City and Elm City.  The trophy, known to the supporters as "The Big Dumb Whale", is a four-feet-long, 40-pound bull sperm whale carved from white oak.  The sperm whale is the official state animal of Connecticut. The white oak is Connecticut's official state tree, and represents the Charter Oak, where, as tradition has it, Connecticut's Royal Charter of 1662 was hidden from the English governor-general.  In the competition's inaugural season, Elm City won the series 3–2 on aggregate. In 2018, HCFC took The Whale in the regular season's lone matchup, in a 2–1 win at home. Hartford retained The Whale in 2019, as Elm City Express spent the season on hiatus.

In 2019, the Agents of Hale along with Kingston Stockade FC's Dutch Guard established the Wooden Shoe, a fan cup to be awarded to the winner of the season series between the two teams. The Wooden Shoe pays homage to the Dutch origins of both cities. Stockade FC defeated Hartford City 2–1 on aggregate to win the first Wooden Shoe.

In 2021, Stockade retained the Shoe, winning the series 4–1 on aggregate.

Record

Year-by-year

Honors 

National Premier Soccer League (Fourth Division)
 North Atlantic Conference
 Champions (1): 2021

References

External links
 

2015 establishments in Connecticut
Soccer clubs in Connecticut
Defunct Major Arena Soccer League teams
Americans
National Premier Soccer League teams
Association football clubs established in 2015
Sports in New Britain, Connecticut